COFCO (full name: China Oil and Foodstuffs Corporation) is a Chinese state-owned food processing holding company. COFCO Group is China's largest food processor, manufacturer and trader. It is also one of Asia's leading agribusiness groups alongside Wilmar International.

Its headquarters are in the COFCO Fortune Plaza (中粮福临门大厦) in Chaoyang District, Beijing.

Background
Founded in 1949, it is one of the largest SOEs of those under the direct supervision of the SASAC. Between 1952 and 1987, it was the sole agricultural products importer and exporter operating under direct control of the central government. In 2007, COFCO had just over 60,000 employees in multiple locations in China as well as overseas operations in countries such as Japan, US, UK, Australia and Canada.

Besides the foodstuff business, COFCO has developed into a diversified conglomerate, involving planting, cultivation, food-processing, finance, warehouse, transportation, port facilities, hotels and real estate. It is one of the top 500 enterprises chosen by US's Fortune Magazine.

COFCO has four companies listed in Hong Kong, namely, China Foods, China Agri-Industries Holdings, Mengniu Dairy, and COFCO Packaging Holdings and three companies listed in mainland China, namely, COFCO Tunhe, COFCO Property, and BBCA. COFCO boasts a wide range of branded products and service portfolios, such as Fortune edible oil, Great Wall wine, Mengniu dairy, Lohas fruit and vegetable juice, Le Conte chocolate, Tunhe tomato products, Joycome meat products, Joy City shopping mall, Yalong Bay resorts, Gloria hotels, Snow-Lotus cashmere, Zhongcha tea products, COFCO-Aviva Life Insurance, COFCO Trust, etc.

Subsidiaries 
China Foods Limited, a listed subsidiary of COFCO Group
China Agri-Industries Holdings Limited, a listed subsidiary of COFCO Group

Equity investments
 UBS Securities (14%)
 Mengniu Dairy (31.25%) as of December 2019

References

External links 
COFCO

 
Food and drink companies established in 1952
Government-owned companies of China
Food manufacturers of China
Trading companies of China
1952 establishments in China
Chinese brands

de:COFCO